The Miss Wisconsin's Outstanding Teen competition is the pageant that selects the representative for the U.S. state of Wisconsin in the Miss America's Outstanding Teen pageant. The pageant is held each June in Oshkosh, Wisconsin.

Evelyn Green of Oshkosh was crowned Miss Wisconsin's Outstanding Teen on June 17, 2022 at the Alberta Kimball Auditorium in Oshkosh, Wisconsin. She competed in the Miss America's Outstanding Teen 2023 pageant at the Hyatt Regency Dallas in Dallas, Texas on August 12, 2022.

Results summary
The results of Miss Wisconsin's Outstanding Teen as they participated in the national Miss America's Outstanding Teen competition. The year in parentheses indicates the year of the Miss America's Outstanding Teen competition the award/placement was garnered.

Placements
 Miss America's Outstanding Teen: Jeanette Morelan (2010)
 Top 10: Allie Rick (2007), Bishara Dorre (2008), JamieNicole Morelan (2014)
 Top 11: Kylene Spanbauer (2017)

Awards

Preliminary awards

 Preliminary Lifestyle and Fitness: Bishara Dorre (2008)
 Preliminary Talent: Kylene Spanbauer (2017)

Non-finalist awards
 Non-finalist Talent: Elise O'Connell (2015)

Other awards

 Top 5 Interview: JamieNicole Morelan (2014)

Winners

References

External links
 Official website

Wisconsin
Wisconsin culture
Women in Wisconsin
Annual events in Wisconsin